Chrząszczewo  is a village in the administrative district of Gmina Kamień Pomorski, within Kamień County, West Pomeranian Voivodeship, in north-western Poland.

The village has a population of 150.

See also
History of Pomerania

References

Villages in Kamień County